Mayo-Tsanaga is a department of Extreme-Nord Province in Cameroon. The department covers an area of 4,393 km and at the 2005 Census had a total population of 699,971. The capital of the department is at Mokolo. It is located within the Mandara Mountains, on the border with Nigeria.

Subdivisions
The department is divided administratively into 7 communes and in turn into villages.

Communes 
 Bourrha
 Hina
 Koza
 Mogodé
 Mokolo
 Mozogo
 Souledé-Roua

Gallery

References

Departments of Cameroon
Far North Region (Cameroon)